Coach driver may refer to:

 A carriage driver or (dated) coachman, see also coach (carriage)
 A bus driver, see also coach (bus)